The mainland serow (Capricornis sumatraensis) is a serow species native to the Himalayas, Southeast Asia and China.

The mainland serow is related closely to the red serow, Himalayan serow, Sumatran serow, and the Chinese serow (C. milneedwardsii).

Taxonomy 
In 1831, Brian Houghton Hodgson first described a goat-like animal with short annulated horns occurring in montane regions between the Sutlej and Teesta Rivers under the name "Bubaline Antelope". As "Bubaline" was preoccupied, he gave it the scientific name Antelope thar a few months later.
When William Ogilby described the genus Capricornis in 1838, he determined the Himalayan serow as type species of this genus.

Teeth from C. sumatraensis were found in a dig from Khok Sung, estimated to originate from the Middle Pleistocene.

Characteristics 

The mainland serow possesses guard hairs on its coat that are bristly or coarse and cover the layer of fur closest to its skin to varying degrees. The animal has a mane that runs from the horns to the middle of the dorsal aspect of the animal between the scapulae covering the skin. The horns are only characteristic of the males and are light-colored, approximately six inches in length, and curve slightly towards the animal's back.

Distribution and habitat 

The mainland serow is found in central and southern China, Vietnam, Cambodia, Laos, Myanmar, Thailand, and in Indonesian Islands of Sumatra. Its distribution follows forested mountain ranges.

It prefers rocky terrain but is also found in forests and flat areas. It is able to swim to small offshore islands. This species has a moderate level of tolerance to human disturbance, and could persist well in habitat fragments and secondary forests, though avoiding farmlands.

Behaviour and ecology  
The mainland serow is territorial and lives alone or in small groups.
Females give birth to a single young after a gestation period of about eight months.

Conservation 
The mainland serow is protected under CITES Appendix I.

References

External links 

mainland serow
Mammals of Indonesia
Mammals of Nepal
Mammals of Thailand
Mammals of China
Mammals of Bhutan
Mammals of Malaysia
Fauna of Southeast Asia
mainland serow